State Route 60 (SR 60) is an east–west state highway in the U.S. state of California. It serves the cities and communities on the eastern side of the Los Angeles metropolitan area and runs along the south side of the San Gabriel Valley. It functions as a bypass route of Interstate 10 (I-10) through the area between the East Los Angeles Interchange in Los Angeles and Beaumont. SR 60 provides a route across several spurs of the Peninsular Ranges, linking the Los Angeles Basin with the Pomona Valley and San Gabriel Valley. The highway also runs concurrently with SR 57 and I-215. Portions of SR 60 are designated as either the Pomona Freeway or the Moreno Valley Freeway.

Route description

SR 60 begins at the East Los Angeles Interchange near Downtown Los Angeles, designated as the Pomona Freeway. The freeway heads east from the junction after splitting off from I-10 (Santa Monica Freeway) and passes through East Los Angeles, intersecting I-710 (Long Beach Freeway). Continuing east through the southern San Gabriel Valley, SR 60 passes through many cities and communities, intersecting I-605 (San Gabriel River Freeway) in the City of Industry. It proceeds to overlap with SR 57 (Orange Freeway) in Diamond Bar, right on the edge of the San Gabriel Valley.

A short overlap carries SR 60 traffic on the same roadway as SR 57. The two routes head northeast through an arm of the San Gabriel Valley; after they split, SR 60 ascends slightly and then slopes through the Puente Hills and into the Pomona Valley. Continuing east, SR 60 intersects the Chino Valley Freeway (SR 71) in Pomona, I-15 (Ontario Freeway) in Jurupa Valley, and the Riverside Freeway (SR 91/I-215) in Riverside, California.

Another short overlap carries SR 60 traffic on the same roadway as I-215. The two routes head southeast; after the two freeways split, SR 60 is designated the Moreno Valley Freeway. The freeway runs through communities further east in the Inland Empire. After passing through Moreno Valley, SR 60 runs through the rugged hill country to the east (known as the Badlands to the locals). After that, SR 60 downgrades to an expressway and has several at-grade interchanges with local roads. Finally, in Beaumont, SR 60 ends and merges into I-10 (Christopher Columbus Transcontinental Highway).

SR 60 traverses Los Angeles, San Bernardino, and Riverside counties. As it passes through many of Los Angeles' eastern suburbs in southern San Gabriel and Pomona valleys, it is a major transportation corridor. For the majority of its length, it is generally parallel to, and south of, the San Bernardino Freeway, I-10, and generally parallel to and north of the Riverside Freeway, SR 91. The rapid population growth exacerbates traffic congestion and, therefore, residential, commercial, and industrial development in the Inland Empire. In particular, it has become increasingly clogged of late with shipping container-laden trucks traveling from the ports of Los Angeles and Long Beach to rail yards and warehouses in the Inland Empire. As a result of the rapid development of the Inland Empire since the 1980s, the Moreno Valley Freeway now suffers from severe traffic congestion. In the mid-2000s, the northwestern section concurrently signed with Interstate 215 underwent significant construction to improve traffic flow, but it still suffers from heavy congestion.

The freeway is known as the Pomona Freeway from its western terminus to its junction with SR 91 and I-215 in Riverside, and the Moreno Valley Freeway east of this interchange until its eastern terminus at its junction with I-10. The route is part of the California Freeway and Expressway System, and is part of the National Highway System, a network of highways that are considered essential to the country's economy, defense, and mobility by the Federal Highway Administration.

History

The route takes its number from former US 60, which now begins near Brenda, Arizona, and terminates on the east coast at Virginia Beach, Virginia. Before 1964, US 60 ran from Los Angeles to the Arizona state line, where it continued its nationwide trek, often overlapping US 99 and US 70 along the way. The advent of I-10 created a situation where, at one point, four different signed roads were routed along the state-maintained highway.

In 1964, California implemented a plan to simplify its highway-numbering system, where one state highway had only one route number, and concurrencies were strongly discouraged. As a result, the US 60 designations (along with US 70 and US 99) were removed. I-10 (as Route 10) superseded US 60's alignment from Beaumont to the Arizona state line, even though the routing was only partly a freeway. This left the officially designated Route 60 from Beaumont to Los Angeles orphaned from its original U.S. Highway (which to this day begins at a point on I-10 several miles east of Quartzsite, Arizona). This new Route 60 was provisionally signed as a U.S. Highway since the designation would guide motorists from Los Angeles to Arizona without a completed freeway for I-10; when all of Route 10 was upgraded to a freeway, the U.S. Highway designation disappeared.

At least two California highway signs managed to be overlooked for many years afterward. Along eastbound I-10 at the eastern end of the San Gorgonio Pass, US 60 was co-signed with I-10 on the eastbound overhead signage with Indio as the control city at the junction with SR 111. The signage remained as late as 1979 and had appeared in early scenes of the 1980 movie American Gigolo  where Julian Kay (played by Richard Gere) is en route to Palm Springs on a "substitute" assignment. Replacement overhead signs now have only I-10 with "Indio, other Desert Cities" as the control cities. Another sign on Hess Boulevard at SR 62 in the unincorporated town of Morongo Valley pointed not to I-10, but to US 60 (with evidence of the sign having pointed to both US 70 and US 99 as well) stood through the early 2000s; it has since been removed.

The stretch of SR 60 along the Moreno Valley Freeway made national headlines in April 2004, when five-year-old Ruby Bustamante of Indio and her 26-year-old mother, Norma, were reported missing. Their car had left the road, apparently unwitnessed, between the gap in two guard rails on April 4. It then crashed underneath a tree in a deep ravine. Though Mrs. Bustamante died, presumably at the moment of impact, Ruby survived on her own for ten days on cups of uncooked Top Ramen noodles and bottles of Gatorade which were in the car.

In 1998, the HOV lanes between SR 57 and I-15 opened. In 2005, construction of an HOV lane started between I-605 and Redlands Boulevard in two phases. The construction was finished in 2010 from I-605 to SR 57, and in 2008 from I-15 to Redlands Boulevard. The Grand Avenue (exit 24B) interchange went through some significant construction during this period, which included adding a direct HOV connector to SR 57 and an alternate route for SR 60 west to exit Brea Canyon Road (exit 23). There are no current plans to construct the HOV lanes from I-605 to the East Los Angeles Interchange or Redlands Boulevard to I-10.

On December 14, 2011, a tanker truck carrying  of gasoline caught fire and exploded on the Pomona Freeway in Montebello; this caused Caltrans to rebuild the Paramount Boulevard overpass. Shortly after the rebuilding of the bridge, Caltrans did widening work on Paramount Boulevard's exit and entrance ramps to accommodate the new bridge and installed new traffic signals. There is also a connection to the Monterey Park Market Place via Neil Armstrong Street, a joint venture between Monterey Park and Montebello, which can be accessed through Paramount Boulevard.

In mid-2016, Caltrans started constructing a partial interchange at Lemon Avenue (to Brea Canyon Road) with no westbound exit. On May 1, 2018, the Lemon Avenue eastbound off-ramp exit and westbound on-ramp were opened, and the eastbound off-ramp exit to Brea Canyon Road was removed. The project was finished in late 2018.

To increase safety through the Badlands corridor between Moreno Valley and Beaumont, the Riverside County Transportation Commission (RCTC) partnered with Caltrans to complete a $138 million project to add a truck climbing lane in both directions at Gilman Springs Road and Jack Rabbit Trail. Construction began in the summer of 2019 and was completed in May 2022.

Future
There are plans to convert SR 60 from the Jack Rabbit trail exit to its eastern terminus (I-10) to a full freeway. These plans are only in the environmental phase and have not been approved by Caltrans to begin construction.

A groundbreaking ceremony was held for the future Potrero Boulevard interchange near the Jack Rabbit Trail exit of SR 60 on February 1, 2018. It is planned to be Exit 75.

Exit list

See also

References

External links

California @ AARoads.com - State Route 60
Caltrans: Route 60 highway conditions
California Highways: Route 60
The 60/91/215 Freeway Improvement Project

060
060
State Route 060
State Route 060
State Route 060
Interstate 10
U.S. Route 60
1964 establishments in California